Alphitobius is a genus of darkling beetles in the family Tenebrionidae. There are about 18 described species in Alphitobius.

Species
These 18 species belong to the genus Alphitobius:

 Alphitobius acutangulus Gebien, 1921
 Alphitobius arnoldi
 Alphitobius capitaneus Schawaller & Grimm, 2014
 Alphitobius crenatus (Klug, 1833)
 Alphitobius diaperinus (Panzer, 1797) (lesser mealworm)
 Alphitobius grandis Fairmaire, 1897
 Alphitobius hobohmi Koch, 1953
 Alphitobius karrooensis Koch, 1953
 Alphitobius kochi Ardoin, 1958
 Alphitobius laevigatus (Fabricius, 1781) (black fungus beetle)
 Alphitobius lamottei Ardoin, 1963
 Alphitobius leleupi Koch, 1953
 Alphitobius limbalis Fairmaire, 1901
 Alphitobius lucasorum Bremer, 1985
 Alphitobius niger Ferrer, 1983
 Alphitobius parallelipennis Koch, 1953
 Alphitobius rugosulus Koch, 1953
 Alphitobius viator Mulsant & Godart, 1868

References

Further reading

External links

 

Tenebrioninae
Articles created by Qbugbot